Happy Faces are a brand of biscuit made by United Biscuits' subsidiary Jacob's Bakery Ltd. Similar to Jammie Dodgers, they are composed of two pieces of shortcake filled in the middle with raspberry jam and (unlike Jammie Dodgers) cream. The shortcake pieces are imprinted with faces (five types) that have holes where the eyes and mouth would go which allows one to see the filling. The biscuits are 45mm in diameter and sold in packs of 10. Involved in the original design process was Project and Design Engineer Peter Stitson for the biscuit making machinery in the late 60s or 70s when the company was known as Nabisco Frears. Happy Face was discontinued as a separate product in the mid 2010s and since were only found in Family Circle biscuit packs until 2020. 

In the United States, Nabisco produced a since-discontinued version called Giggles.

External links
A review of Happy Faces

British brands
Biscuit brands